Welshpool was a railway station on the South Gippsland line in South Gippsland, Victoria. The station formerly served the small town of Welshpool. The station was opened during the 1890s and operated until the 1980s. The site of the station contains a preserved platform and the base of its crane. The station no longer contains the tiny building that was donated to Loch station. Near the former station is Welshpool Hospital.

References

Disused railway stations in Victoria (Australia)
Transport in Gippsland (region)
Shire of South Gippsland